Craspedaria coronula is a species of air-breathing land snail in the genus Geomitridae.

Craspedaria coronula is endemic to the Madeira Archipelago, and is currently only found on Deserta Grande Island. It was originally described by English malacologist Richard Thomas Lowe in 1852, from a Quaternary fossil deposit found in the southern part of Bugio Island.

References

External links
 Lowe, R. T. (1852). Brief diagnostic notices of new Maderan land shells. The Annals and Magazine of Natural History. (2) 9 (50): 112-120; (2) 9 (52): 275-279. London

Endemic fauna of Madeira
Molluscs of Madeira
Gastropods described in 1852
Geomitridae